Tropical Storm Edouard was the first of eight named storms to form in September 2002, the most such storms in the North Atlantic for any month at the time. The fifth tropical storm of the 2002 Atlantic hurricane season, Edouard developed into a tropical cyclone on September 1 from an area of atmospheric convection associated with a cold front east of Florida. Under weak steering currents, Edouard drifted to the north and executed a clockwise loop to the west. Edouard made landfall on northeastern Florida on September 5, and after crossing the state it dissipated on September 6 while becoming absorbed into the larger circulation of Tropical Storm Fay.

Florida received moderate rainfall from Edouard, with floods exceeding  in the western portion of the state. Though Edouard was a tropical storm at landfall, wind speeds along the storm's path over land were light. The rain flooded several roads; however, there were no casualties, and damage was minimal.

Meteorological history

An area of cloudiness and rain showers developed several hundred miles east-southeast of Bermuda on August 25, likely in association with a low-level disturbance that formed along a cold front. For several days, it moved southwestward, and, while located on the southwestern end of an upper-level trough to the north of Puerto Rico, deep atmospheric convection throughout the system increased. The system tracked westward, and initially remained disorganized while surface pressures remained high. The system started to drift northwest and began to slowly organize on August 30 while located a few hundred miles northeast of the Bahamas. Conditions remained favorable for continued organization, and convection persisted and increased across the system.

Upon first forming, the tropical depression was located in an area of light to moderate westerly wind shear. With a ridge to the north and west of the depression, the system moved to the northwest under weak steering currents. The storm remained disorganized with wind shear displacing most of the deep convection from the low-level circulation. However, forecasters admitted little confidence in the prediction, with later forecasts predicting the storm to execute a loop and track westward into northern Florida or southern Georgia. Shortly after the tropical cyclogenesis of Edouard, steering currents became weak, resulting in the storm to turn sharply eastward. Late on September 2, deep convection developed over the center, though the center quickly became exposed again. The environment appeared to become more hostile on September 2 and 3 with increasing shear and dry air overspreading the center.

Shortly after peaking in intensity, Tropical Storm Edouard began to weaken as convection diminished from vertical shear and dry air, with its center becoming exposed from the steadily decreasing convection later on September 3. The development of a weak and narrow mid-level ridge turned the storm to the west-southwest towards northeastern Florida. Despite strong levels of wind shear, Edouard remained a tropical storm while producing sporadic amounts of deep convection, with the banding structure improving on September 4. Early on September 5, Edouard made landfall near Ormond Beach, Florida as a minimal tropical storm, and almost immediately weakened to a tropical depression over land. It tracked across the state for about 13 hours and entered the Gulf of Mexico near Crystal River. Initial forecasts predicted Edouard to re-strengthen to a tropical storm over the northeastern Gulf of Mexico, though uncertainty was noted due to the development of Tropical Storm Fay in the northwestern portion of the gulf. Upon entering the Gulf of Mexico, the depression encountered strong wind shear from the outflow of Tropical Storm Fay. Edouard generated minimal amounts of intermittent convection along the southeastern portion of its circulation, enough for it to remain a tropical cyclone. The remaining convection, however, disappeared by September 6, with Edouard dissipating while becoming absorbed into the larger circulation of Tropical Storm Fay.

Preparations

Three hours after developing, the National Hurricane Center issued a tropical storm watch from Titusville, Florida, to Brunswick, Georgia, due to uncertainty in the track of the storm. Hours after becoming a tropical storm, a tropical storm warning was issued from Fernandina Beach, Florida, to the mouth of the Savannah River, with a tropical storm watch further northward to the mouth of the South Santee River in South Carolina, though these were cancelled after Edouard turned to the east. About 10 hours before landfall, the National Hurricane Center issued another tropical storm warning from Titusville, Florida to Brunswick, Georgia, with a tropical storm watch further south to Sebastian Inlet, Florida.

Two days before the storm made landfall, several Florida counties were monitoring the progress of the storm. Though no serious impact was anticipated, Brevard County officials identified possible shelters if warranted. Putnam County officials placed several shelters on standby, and utility crews in Duval County were placed on standby in the event of power failure. Several media releases of information were issued regarding the storm. The State Emergency Operation Center was on Level 2, or partial activation, and the state government organized two conferences to discuss county actions in regards to the storm. The National Weather Service issued a flood watch hours before Edouard made landfall for much of eastern Florida due to the expected rainfall from the storm.

The South Carolina Emergency Management Division monitored the progress of the storm, and the Division increased its awareness level in response to the storm. Important state agencies in South Carolina government were notified to be ready to respond if the need arose.

Impact

In Bermuda, the outflow from the storm produced cloudy conditions throughout the island. Squally conditions were reported a short distance to the west of the island, though no rain was reported on Bermuda.

While moving erratically off the east coast of Florida, Tropical Storm Edouard produced rough surf conditions and rip currents along many beaches. Beachgoers and visitors were advised to exercise extreme caution. The storm produced water levels about 6 inches above normal near Cape Canaveral, though elsewhere wave action and storm tides were not significant. Despite being a tropical storm at landfall, sustained tropical storm force winds were not observed. Edouard dropped light to moderate rainfall in eastern Florida, primarily during 2 to 3 hour periods.

Moderate rainfall resulted in river flooding along the St. Johns River, resulting in flooding along roads in Seminole County. Roadway, urban, and lowland flooding was also reported in the counties of Brevard and Orange. Roadway flooding was extensive in some areas, resulting in road closures in Oviedo, Cocoa Beach, and Cape Canaveral. Heavy rainfall in Pinellas Park caused heavy street flooding along an intersection on U.S. Highway 19. No casualties were reported, and no damage was known to have been incurred.

See also

 List of Florida hurricanes (2000–present)
 Other storms of the same name

References

External links

 
 National Hurricane Center Advisory Archive

2002 Atlantic hurricane season
Atlantic tropical storms
Hurricanes in Florida
2002 natural disasters in the United States
Edouard